Baghdad is the capital city of Iraq. 

Bagdad may also refer to:

Places

Other 
 Bagdad, Tasmania, Australia
 Bagdad, New Brunswick, Canada
 Bagdad, Tamaulipas, Mexico
 Bagdad, Poland

United States 
 Bagdad, Arizona
 Bagdad, California
 Bagdad, Butte County, California
 Bagdad, Florida
 Bagdad, Kentucky
 Bagdad, New York
 Bagdad, Virginia
 Bagdad, Wisconsin, a ghost town

Arts and media
 Bagdad (film), a 1949 American motion picture
 "Bagdad" (song), a 2018 song by Rosalía
 "Bagdad", a song by American band Ra
 The Sala Bagdad (es:), an erotic theater in Barcelona, Spain

See also
 Baghdad (disambiguation)